Talitiga Crawley (born 29 August 1991 in Moto'otua) is a Samoan taekwondo practitioner. She competed for Samoa at the 2012 Summer Olympics, having qualified for the competition. She studied under her coach Kesi O'Neill.

References

External links
 
Talitiga Crawley profile at BBC Sport

1991 births
Samoan female taekwondo practitioners
Living people
Olympic taekwondo practitioners of Samoa
Taekwondo practitioners at the 2012 Summer Olympics